The Selemdzha Range is a range of mountains in the Russian Far East. Administratively it belongs partly to Amur Oblast and partly to the Khabarovsk Krai of the Russian Federation. 

There is gold ore prospection in the area of the range.

Geography
The Selemdzha Range is a range of moderate altitudes located in the eastern end of Amur Oblast and the western side of Khabarovsk Krai. River Inaragda, a right tributary of the Selitkan, has its sources in the range.

The range runs in a roughly east/west direction for about  flanking the northern banks of the Selemdzha River.
To the north of the western part of the mountain chain rises the Dzhagdy Range and to the south of its eastern part, the Ezop Range, running roughly parallel to it. The northern end of the Yam-Alin and the southern end of the Taikan Range meet at the easternmost limit of the range.

Flora 
The slopes of the range are covered by taiga, mainly consisting of larch.

See also
List of mountains and hills of Russia
Northeast Siberian taiga
Selemdzha mine

References

External links
Селемджа: evendym - LiveJournal
Gorny Journal, 1905

Mountain ranges of Amur Oblast
Mountain ranges of Khabarovsk Krai
Mountain ranges of Russia
ru:Селемджинский хребет